Aphasmaphleps is a genus of flies in the family Dolichopodidae from the Afrotropical realm. The genus was first described by Igor Grichanov in 2010. The name Aphasmaphleps refers to the genus Phasmaphleps, which was originally considered to be closely related to it. According to Capellari & Grichanov (2012), Aphasmaphleps more closely resembles Asyndetus and Cryptophleps.

Species
The genus contains four species:
 Aphasmaphleps bandia Grichanov, 2010
 Aphasmaphleps bickeli Capellari & Grichanov, 2012
 Aphasmaphleps paulyi Capellari & Grichanov, 2012
 Aphasmaphleps stuckenbergi Capellari & Grichanov, 2012

References

Dolichopodidae genera
Diaphorinae
Diptera of Africa